P. maritimus may refer to:
 Petrobius maritimus, the shore bristletail or sea bristletail, a species of Archaeognatha
 Pseudococcus maritimus, the grape mealybug, is a scale insect species

See also 
 Maritimus (disambiguation)